Tamasini is a tribe of cicadas in the family Cicadidae, found in Australia. There are at least two genera and about eight described species in Tamasini.

Genera
These two genera belong to the tribe Tamasini:
 Parnquila Moulds, 2012
 Tamasa Distant, 1905

References

Further reading

External links

 

 
Cicadinae
Hemiptera tribes